Shinsaku (written: ,  or ) is a masculine Japanese given name. Notable people with the name include:

, Japanese basketball player
, Japanese golfer
, Japanese footballer
, Japanese samurai
, Japanese gymnast
, Japanese chess player
, Japanese writer and Japan Ground Self-Defense Force officer

See also
9076 Shinsaku, a main-belt asteroid

Japanese masculine given names